The 1924 Tour de France was the 18th edition of Tour de France, one of cycling's Grand Tours. The Tour began in Paris with a flat stage on 22 June, and Stage 9 occurred on 8 July with a mountainous stage from Toulon. The race finished in Paris on 20 July.

Stage 9
8 July 1924 — Toulon to Nice,

Stage 10
10 July 1924 — Nice to Briançon,

Stage 11
12 July 1924 — Briançon to Gex,

Stage 12
14 July 1924 — Gex to Strasbourg,

Stage 13
16 July 1924 — Strasbourg to Metz,

Stage 14
18 July 1924 — Metz to Dunkerque,

Stage 15
20 July 1924 — Dunkerque to Paris,

References

1924 Tour de France
Tour de France stages